Qaleh Juqeh (also Romanized as Qal‘eh Jūqeh; also known as Qal‘eh Jūgheh) is a village in Kani Bazar Rural District, Khalifan District, Mahabad County, West Azerbaijan Province, Iran. At the 2006 census, its population was 235, in 33 families.

References 

Populated places in Mahabad County